Dvalin may mean:
Dvalin was a ruler of the dwarves in Norse mythology
Dvalin was also the name of one of the four stags of Yggdrasill.
Dwalin is a dwarf in Tolkien's The Hobbit.